The Republican Front was a political party in Zimbabwe in the 1980s, led by Ian Smith as the continuation of the Rhodesian Front.  The name change came on June 6, 1981, as an attempt to distance itself from its policies of the past.

On July 21, 1984, it was renamed the Conservative Alliance of Zimbabwe.  At that time the party, which had an all-white membership, asked blacks to join it and oppose the policies of the Robert Mugabe government.

References

1981 establishments in Zimbabwe
1984 disestablishments in Zimbabwe
Conservative parties in Zimbabwe
Defunct political parties in Zimbabwe
Political parties disestablished in 1984
Political parties established in 1981
Protestant political parties
White nationalism in Zimbabwe
White nationalist parties
Right-wing parties